Court Building, also known as the Furniture Building, is a historic commercial building located in downtown Evansville, Indiana. It was designed by the architectural firm Harris & Shopbell and built in 1909. It is a seven-story, Beaux Arts style building sheathed in brick and limestone.

It was listed on the National Register of Historic Places in 1982.

References

Commercial buildings on the National Register of Historic Places in Indiana
Beaux-Arts architecture in Indiana
Commercial buildings completed in 1909
Buildings and structures in Evansville, Indiana
National Register of Historic Places in Evansville, Indiana